Yegor Vadimovich Proshkin (born 15 January 1999) is a Russian football player. He plays for FC Torpedo Moscow and FC Torpedo-2.

Club career
He made his debut in the Russian Professional Football League for FC Khimki-M on 10 August 2018 in a game against FC Metallurg Lipetsk.

He made his Russian Football National League debut for FC Torpedo Moscow on 2 August 2020 in a game against FC Shinnik Yaroslavl. He made his Russian Premier League debut for Torpedo on 21 August 2022 against FC Zenit Saint Petersburg.

Honours
Torpedo Moscow
 Russian Football National League : 2021-22

Career statistics

References

External links
 Profile by Football National League

1999 births
Footballers from Moscow
Living people
Russian footballers
Association football defenders
FC Khimki players
FC Torpedo Moscow players
Russian Second League players
Russian First League players
Russian Premier League players